Gérard Blitz (1 August 1901 – 8 March 1979) was a Belgian Olympic swimmer and water polo player who competed at the 1920, 1924, 1928 and 1936 Olympics. He was the younger brother of Maurice Blitz, also a water polo player, and uncle of Gérard Blitz who founded Club Med in 1950.

Biography
At the 1920 Summer Olympics Blitz won a bronze medal in the 100 m backstroke, and a silver medal with the Belgian water polo team, which also included his brother Maurice. He failed to reach the finals of the 100 m and 4 × 200 m freestyle events.

On 16 September 1921 he set a world record in the 400 m backstroke at 5:59.2, that lasted until 1927.

At the 1924 Summer Olympics, the Blitz brothers were still part of the Belgian water polo squad. The team won another silver medal. Blitz also finished fourth in the 100 m backstroke swimming event. He had little luck at the 1928 Games, as his water polo team finished fifth, and he was eliminated in the heats of his swimming events. Eight years later, at the Berlin Games, he won his last Olympic medal, a bronze in water polo. He played all seven matches. Blitz was one of a number of Jewish athletes who won medals at the 1936 Nazi Olympics.

Blitz died in 1979. In 1990 he was inducted in the International Swimming Hall of Fame.

See also
 Belgium men's Olympic water polo team records and statistics
 List of Olympic medalists in swimming (men)
 List of Olympic medalists in water polo (men)
 List of players who have appeared in multiple men's Olympic water polo tournaments
 List of members of the International Swimming Hall of Fame
 List of select Jewish swimmers
 List of select Jewish water polo players

References

External links

 

1901 births
1979 deaths
Belgian male freestyle swimmers
Belgian male backstroke swimmers
Belgian male water polo players
Swimmers at the 1920 Summer Olympics
Swimmers at the 1924 Summer Olympics
Swimmers at the 1928 Summer Olympics
Water polo players at the 1920 Summer Olympics
Water polo players at the 1924 Summer Olympics
Water polo players at the 1928 Summer Olympics
Water polo players at the 1936 Summer Olympics
Olympic swimmers of Belgium
Olympic water polo players of Belgium
Olympic silver medalists for Belgium
Olympic bronze medalists for Belgium
Swimmers from Amsterdam
Jewish swimmers
Jewish water polo players
Jewish Belgian sportspeople
Belgian Jews
Olympic bronze medalists in swimming
Olympic medalists in water polo
Dutch male freestyle swimmers
Medalists at the 1936 Summer Olympics
Medalists at the 1924 Summer Olympics
Medalists at the 1920 Summer Olympics
Olympic silver medalists in swimming